The reciprocal Fibonacci constant, or ψ, is defined as the sum of the reciprocals of the Fibonacci numbers:

The ratio of successive terms in this sum tends to the reciprocal of the golden ratio. Since this is less than 1, the ratio test shows that the sum converges.

The value of ψ is known to be approximately

 .

Gosper describes an algorithm for fast numerical approximation of its value. The reciprocal Fibonacci series itself provides O(k) digits of accuracy for k terms of expansion, while Gosper's accelerated series provides O(k&hairsp;2) digits.
ψ is known to be irrational; this property was conjectured by Paul Erdős, Ronald Graham, and Leonard Carlitz, and proved in 1989 by Richard André-Jeannin.

The continued fraction representation of the constant is:

  .

See also

List of sums of reciprocals

References

External links

Mathematical constants
Fibonacci numbers
Irrational numbers